Walking to Paris is an upcoming French–Italian–Swiss biographical drama film directed and written by Peter Greenaway. It is devoted to an 18-month journey through Europe, by Constantin Brâncuși, at the beginning of the 20th century. The film is not a documentary, nor really a biographical film, but a fiction imagined by the British director from a real fact of which hardly any details are known.

Synopsis 
The film is devoted to the journey of a young 26/27-year-old artist destined to become famous, Constantin Brâncuși, traveling through Europe. He leaves from Romania where he was born and where he began to study fine arts, to Paris where he wishes to deepen this training. This journey is a real fact, made on foot over 2500 kilometers, across Europe at the beginning of the 20th century. It lasted 18 months. However, the details of this adventure remained unknown. Peter Greenaway has built a cinematic fiction from this trip, and imagines comic or violent adventures, sometimes sexual and sometimes romantic. The peregrination thus reconstituted is also marked out by the construction of sculptures with the materials found along the way.

Cast 
 Emun Elliott as Constantin Brâncuși
 Paolo Bernardini as Constantin Brâncuși
 Andrea Scarduzio as Constantin Brâncuși
 Jacopo Uccella as Constantin Brâncuși
 Carla Juri as Lucy
 Remo Girone as son of Brancusi 
 Marcello Mazzarella as Auguste Rodin
 Anthony Souter as Jonathan Art Historian

Production

Filming 
The winter sequences were shot in Switzerland in 2015, and the summer scenes in 2016 and 2017, in Switzerland and Italy.

Music 
The original soundtrack is by Marco Robino, Marco Gentile, and the Turin Architorti string quintet, picking up a collaboration already provided with the director (Rembrandt's J'accuse, Goltzius and the Pelican Company)

References

External links
 
 

Upcoming films
Swiss drama films
French drama films
Italian drama films
Biographical films about sculptors